Mount Elkins, also known as Jökelen (which means "The Glacier") is a dark, steep-sided mountain with three major peaks, the highest  above sea level, in the Napier Mountains of Enderby Land. Enderby Land is part of East Antarctica, and is claimed by Australia as part of the Australian Antarctic Territory. The mountain was named after Terence James Elkins, an ionospheric physicist with the Australian National Antarctic Research Expeditions at Mawson Station in 1960.

Location
Some notable geographic features in the general vicinity of Mount Elkins include Cape Batterbee (92 km to the north), the Young Nunataks (7.4 km to the south), Sørtoppen Nunatak (30 km to the east), the Newman Nunataks (26 km to the west), Mount McMaster (97 km to the west), and Mount Kjerringa (57 km to the northeast). The nearest permanently inhabited place is Mawson Station, an Australian research station to the southeast. Molodyozhnaya Station, a former Soviet research station which was mothballed in 1989, is located to the southwest of Mount Elkins.

Mount Elkins is the highest peak in the Napier Mountains. It is the highest peak in Enderby Land.

Geology & orogeny

Much of the East Antarctic craton was formed in the Precambrian period by a series of tectonothermal orogenic events. Napier orogeny formed the cratonic nucleus approximately 4 billion years ago. Mount Elkins is a classic example of Napier orogeny. Napier orogeny is characterized by high-grade metamorphism and plate tectonics. The orogenic events which resulted in the formation of the Napier Complex (including Mount Elkins) have been dated to the Archean Eon. Radiometrically dated to as old as 3.8 billion years, some of the zircons collected from the orthogneisses of the Napier Complex are among the oldest rock specimens found on Earth. Billions of years of erosion and tectonic deformation have exposed the metamorphic rock core of these ancient mountains.

The oldest crustal components found to date in the Napier Complex appear to be of igneous derivation. This rock appears to have been overprinted by an ultra-high temperature metamorphic event (UHT) that occurred near the Archean-Proterozoic boundary. Using a lutetium-hafnium (Lu-Hf) method to examine garnet, orthopyroxene, sapphirine, osumilite and rutile from this UHT granulite belt, Choi et al determined an isochron age of 2.4 billion years for this metamorphic event. Using SHRIMPU–Pb zircon dating methodology, Belyatsky et al determined the oldest tectonothermal event in the formation of the Napier Complex to have occurred approximately 2.8 billion years ago.

Preservation of the UHT mineral assemblage in the analyzed rock suggests rapid cooling, with closure likely to have occurred for the Lu-Hf system at post-peak UHT conditions near a closure temperature of 800 °C. UHT granulites appear to have evolved in a low Lu-Hf environment, probably formed when the rocks were first extracted from a mantle profoundly depleted in lithophile elements. The source materials for the magmas that formed the Napier Complex were extremely depleted relative to the chondritic uniform reservoir (CHUR). These results also suggest significant depletion of the early Archean mantle, in agreement with the early igneous differentiation of the Earth that the latest core formation models require.

Ecology
Flora
To date, no flora has been observed at Mount Elkins.

Fauna
The following species have been sighted within 1.0 degrees of Mount Elkins:

Significance to mountaineers
The summit of Mount Elkins is higher than that of any mountain in Australia—including even Mount Kosciuszko (2,228 metres), which is one of the Seven Summits. Because of its remoteness it has not become a popular target for peak bagging.

Weather conditions
The Napier Mountains run northwest from Mount Elkins. To the east is a large valley formed by the Robert and Wilma Glaciers. To the northeast are the Seaton and Rippon Glaciers. All of these glaciers run into the King Edward Ice Shelf. Other notable terrain features in this area include the Beaver Glacier, located to the west of Mount King. Collectively, these terrain features significantly modify weather produced by synoptic scale systems. Dramatic changes can occur over short distances and in short time intervals.

Nearby terrain features
Place names within 1.0 degrees of Mount Elkins (Latitude 66°40.0'S Longitude 54°09.0'E)

History
Mount Elkins was first mapped by Norwegian cartographers from aerial photographs taken by the Lars Christensen Expedition, 1936–37, and named at that time Jökelen (The Glacier). It was remapped by ANARE from aerial photographs taken from an ANARE aircraft in 1956. The Napier Mountains were first visited by an ANARE survey party from Mawson Station in 1960. The survey party was led by Syd Kirkby, and included Terence James Elkins.

See also
 History of Antarctica
 List of Antarctic expeditions
 Research stations in Antarctica

References

Further reading
 Douglas Mawson, the Survivor, by David Parer and Elizabeth Parer-Cook (Morwell, Victoria: Allela Books and the Australian Broadcasting Corporation, 1983).
 Antarctic Days with Mawson : A Personal Account of the British, Australian and New Zealand Antarctic Research Expedition of 1929-31, by Harold Fletcher (Sydney: Angus and Robertson, 1984).
 Going to Extremes: Project Blizzard and Australia's Antarctic Heritage (Sydney: Doubleday, 1986).
 International Law and Australian Sovereignty in Antarctica, by Gillian Triggs (Sydney: Legal Books Pty Ltd, 1986).
 Antarctic Science, edited by DWH Walton, with contributions by CSM Doake, JR Dudley, I Everson and RM Laws (Cambridge; Melbourne: Cambridge University Press, 1987).
 International Research in the Antarctic, by Richard Fifield (Oxford: Oxford University Press for the Scientific Committee on Antarctic Research, 1987).
 Antarctica: The Next Decade: Report of a Group Study Chaired by Sir Anthony Parsons (Studies in Polar Research), edited by Sir Anthony Parsons (Cambridge: Cambridge University Press, 1987).
 Mawson's Antarctic Diaries, edited by Fred and Eleanor Jacka (Sydney: Allen & Unwin, 1988).
 Aurora Australis, edited by E.H. Shackleton (Sydney: Bay Books, 1988).
 Sitting on Penguins: People and Politics in Australian Antarctica, by Stephen Murray-Smith (Surry Hills, NSW Hutchinson Australia, 1988).
 Antarctica: The Extraordinary History of Man's Conquest of the Frozen Continent (Sydney: Reader's Digest, 1988).
 A History of Antarctic Science, by G E Fogg (Cambridge: Cambridge University Press, 1992).
 The Australian Geographic Book of Antarctica, by Keith Scott (Terrey Hills, New South Wales: Australian Geographic for the Australian Geographic Society, 1993).
 A History of Antarctica, by Stephen Martin (Sydney: State Library of New South Wales Press, 1996).
 The Home of the Blizzard: The Story of the Australasian Antarctic Expedition, 1911-14, by Douglas Mawson (Kent Town, South Australia: Wakefield Press, 1996).
 An Alien in Antarctica: Reflections upon Forty Years of Exploration and Research on the Frozen Continent, by Charles Swithinbank (Blacksburg, Virginia: McDonald & Woodward Publishing Company, 1997).
 A revised Archaean chronology for the Napier Complex, Enderby Land, from SHRIMP ion-microprobe studies, S.L. Harley and L.P. Black, Antarctic Science (1997), 9: 74-91 Cambridge University Press.
 The Silence Calling: Australians in Antarctica 1947-97: the ANARE Jubilee history, by Tim Bowden (St Leonards, New South Wales: Allen & Unwin, 1997).
 The Backpackers' Guide to ANARE Science (Kingston, Tas.: Australian Antarctic Division, 2000).
 To the ends of the earth: the history of polar exploration, by Richard Sale (London: HarperCollins, 2002).
 Voyage to the end of the world: Tales from the Great Ice Barrier, by David Burke (Annandale, NSW: Envirobook, 2002).
 Australian Antarctic science: the first 50 years of ANARE, edited by Harvey J. Marchant, Desmond J. Lugg and Patrick G. Quilty (Kingston, Tas.: Australian Antarctic Division, 2002).
 End of the Earth: voyages to Antarctica, by Peter Matthiessen (National Geographic Society, 2003).

External links
 Australian Antarctic Division
 Australian Antarctic Gazetteer
 Australian Antarctic Names and Medals Committee (AANMC)
 Scientific Committee on Antarctic Research (SCAR)
 PDF Map of the Australian Antarctic Territory
 Mawson Station
 ANARE Club
 List of Peaks in Enderby Land
 A satellite map of Mount Elkins at the United States Antarctic Resource Center's Atlas of Antarctic Research.
 Animation of craton formation of Antarctica Precambrian formation of the Antarctic craton, beginning with Napier orogenic events

Mountains of Enderby Land